The SEC–Big East Challenge was an in-season NCAA Division I men's college basketball series, matching up teams from the Southeastern Conference and the original Big East Conference. The event, which was held each season from 2007 to 2012, took place in early December each year, before the start of conference play.

The original six-year contract for the series expired in 2013 and was not renewed. This was likely an effect of the 2010–13 Big East Conference realignment, which resulted in the members of the original Big East splitting up into the football-sponsoring American Athletic Conference ("The American") and a new, non-football Big East Conference in the summer of 2013. The SEC proceeded to establish a new series with the Big 12 Conference called the Big 12/SEC Challenge.

Format 

Initially, each annual series included four games featuring four teams from each conference. The games were held as two double-headers in two different, typically off-campus, sites. Though most of the sites were not home arenas for the teams featured in the event, many were in the same cities as one of the participants. Madison Square Garden in New York City hosted a double-header in 2009 that featured the St. John's Red Storm, who use the Garden as their home arena for some games. In 2010, two games were held at Freedom Hall in Louisville, Kentucky, which served as the Louisville Cardinals' home arena until the KFC Yum! Center opened for the 2010–11 season. Other venues were occasional home venues for invitational participants. Villanova occasionally plays at the Wells Fargo Center in Philadelphia, where they participated in the first year of the Invitational in 2007 (when the venue was known as Wachovia Center). Pittsburgh occasionally hosts games in the Consol Energy Center since it opened in 2010, where they played in the invitational in December of that year.

Starting with the 2011–12 season, the format was changed to allow every SEC team to participate along with an equal number of Big East teams. This format featured 12 games over three days beginning on the Thursday after Thanksgiving of each year. The locations of the games were also changed; they would be played at home campus sites with each conference hosting six games a year.

For the 2012 challenge, the SEC's new members Texas A&M and Missouri did not participate, while the departure of West Virginia from the Big East meant that only three Big East teams were excluded instead of four.

Team records

In the inaugural series in 2007, the Big East won three games to the SEC's one. The two conferences tied, with each team winning two games, in 2008 and 2009. In the 2010 series, the SEC won for the first time, three games to one. In the 2011 series, the first year with 12 games, the Big East won eight games to four.

Southeastern Conference (15–25)

Big East Conference (25–15)

Results

2007

2008

2009

2010

2011

2012

References

College men's basketball competitions in the United States
Big East Conference men's basketball
Southeastern Conference men's basketball
Recurring sporting events established in 2007
2007 establishments in the United States
2013 disestablishments in the United States